The Germantown Police Department is the law enforcement agency of the city of Germantown, Tennessee, United States.

Organization

Uniform Patrol
The Uniform Patrol division is the largest division within the Germantown Police Department. Responsibilities of the Uniform Patrol Division include: 24-hour patrols by uniformed officers; providing school resource officers; DUI enforcement; running the Critical Injury Crash Investigation Team; running a canine unit; SWAT; and providing school crossing guards.

Investigations Division
The Criminal Investigations Division is  responsible for conducting follow-up investigations to crimes reported to the Germantown Police Department. Responsibilities of the Investigations Division include: comprehensive investigations of reported criminal activity, crime scene processing and collection; evidence preservation and storage; crime and trend analysis; records management and data entry.

Police Services Division
The Police Services Division has the following responsibilities; administering and coordinating community relations; training; running the communications center; running the jail; running the reserve officer program; running the citizen police academy program; employee hiring and recruitment; and administering the Neighborhood Watch program and special events.

Rank structure

See also

 List of law enforcement agencies in Tennessee

References

Municipal police departments of Tennessee
Germantown, Tennessee